Erion Xhafa (born 31 May 1982) is an Albanian retired footballer who played as a defender.

Playing career

Club
He started his career with Dinamo Tirana youth team, and played for Erzeni Shijak for one year, then back to Dinamo Tirana until 2007. In the Summer of 2007 he was transferred to Tirana which was the holder of the championship title at that time.

International
He made his debut for Albania in a March 2006 friendly match against Georgia and earned a total of 3 caps, scoring no goals. His final international was an August 2007 friendly against Malta.

Managerial career
In July 2015, Xhafa was appointed assistant coach to Igli Allmuça at Dinamo Tirana.

Personal life
Erion is the son of Gani Xhafa, one of the veterans of Albanian team Dinamo Tirana and the Albania team remembered for his great performance against some of the best teams of Europe like Ajax on that heroic game with Tirana, finished 2–2 on 16 September 1970.

References

External links

1982 births
Living people
Footballers from Tirana
Albanian footballers
Association football defenders
Albania international footballers
Besa Kavajë players
KF Erzeni players
FK Dinamo Tirana players
KF Tirana players
KF Laçi players
KS Kastrioti players
Kategoria Superiore players
Kategoria e Parë players